Reports regarding the longest recorded sniper kills that contain information regarding the shooting distance and the identity of the sniper have been presented to the general public since 1967. Snipers have had a substantial history following the development of long distance weaponry. As weapons, ammunition, and aids to determine ballistic solutions improved, so too did the distance from which a kill could be targeted.

Sniper technology
Although optical equipment such as rangefinders and ballistic calculators have largely eliminated manual calculations to determine elevation and windage, the fundamentals of accurate and precise long-range shooting remain essentially the same since the early history of shooting, and the skill and training of the shooter, and the shooter's spotter where applicable, are the primary factors. Accuracy and precision of ammunition and firearms are also still reliant primarily on human factors and attention to detail in the complex process of producing maximum performance.

The modern method of long-distance sniping (shots over ) requires intense training and practice. A sniper must have the ability to accurately estimate the various factors that influence a bullet's trajectory and point of impact, such as the shooter's distance from the target, wind direction, wind speed, air density, elevation, and even the Coriolis effect. Mistakes in estimation compound over distance and can cause a shot to only injure, or to miss completely. Any given combination of firearm and ammunition will have an associated value, known as the circular error probable (CEP), defined as the radius of a circle whose boundary is expected to contain the impact points of half of the rounds fired.

If the shooter wishes to improve accuracy, increase range, or both, the accuracy of estimates of external factors must improve accordingly. At extreme ranges, highly accurate estimates are required and even with the most accurate estimates, hitting the target becomes subject to uncontrollable factors. For example, a rifle capable of firing a ½ or 0.5 MOA (approximately 0.5 inch center to center of the two holes furthest apart) 5-round group (often referred to as "grouping") at 100 yards will theoretically fire a 12.5 inch group at 2,500 yards (0.5 × 2,500/100 = 12.5). Unless the group is centered perfectly on the target at 100 yards, the 2,500-yard group will be centered 25 times the off-center error at 100 yards. This example ignores all other factors and assumes no-wind shooting conditions, identical muzzle velocities, and identical ballistic performance for each shot.

USMC Gunnery Sergeant Carlos Hathcock's confirmed  kill in the Vietnam War was primarily due to the enemy soldier stopping his bicycle on the spot Hathcock had fired at while sighting in his Browning M2 heavy machine-gun.

Devices such as laser rangefinders, handheld meteorological measuring equipment, handheld computers, and ballistic-prediction software can contribute to increased accuracy (i.e. reduced CEP), although they rely on proper use and training to realize any advantages. In addition, as instruments of measure, they are subject to accuracy errors and malfunction. Handheld meteorological instruments only measure conditions at the location they are used. Wind direction and speed can vary dramatically along the path of the bullet.

History
The science of long-range sniping came to fruition in the Vietnam War. He recorded 93 official kills. After returning to the US, Hathcock helped to establish the Marine Corps Scout Sniper School at Quantico, Virginia.

In addition to his success as a USMC scout-sniper during multiple deployments to Vietnam, Hathcock competed in multiple USMC shooting teams. Hathcock also won the 1966 Wimbledon Cup, which is earned by the winner of the US 1,000-yard high-powered rifle National Championship. Even after being severely burned during an attack on an Amtrac on which he was riding in his efforts to rescue other soldiers, and after being diagnosed with multiple sclerosis, Hathcock continued to serve, shoot and instruct. In Vietnam, Hathcock also completed missions involving a "through the scope" shot which killed an enemy sniper specifically hunting him, and a multiple-day solo stalk and kill of an enemy general.

Perry held the title for only a few days, as another man in his unit, Corporal Rob Furlong, beat Perry's distance with a  shot in March 2002. Perry and Furlong were part of a six-man sniper team during 2002's Operation Anaconda, part of the War in Afghanistan.

Corporal Furlong's record was bested by a British soldier, Corporal of Horse Craig Harrison, of the Blues and Royals, Household Cavalry, who recorded two consecutive  shots (confirmed by GPS) in November 2009, also during the War in Afghanistan, in which he hit two Taliban insurgents consecutively. Harrison killed the two Taliban machine gunners with shots that took the 8.59 mm (0.338 inch) rounds almost five seconds to hit their targets, which were  beyond the L115A3 sniper rifle’s recommended range. A third shot took out the insurgents' machine gun. The rifle used was made by Accuracy International.

As with the previous two Canadian records, a McMillan Tac-50 with .50 BMG ammunition was used.

Confirmed kills  or greater
This list is not exhaustive, as such data is generally not tracked nor managed under any official procedure. For example, the Canadian Army 2002 sniper team that saw two soldiers (Arron Perry/2,310 m and Rob Furlong/2,430 m) set consecutive new records, also made a number of kills at  that are not counted here. The list also shows that, in some cases, an armed force command may choose to withhold the name of the sniper for security reasons.

Notes

See also

History of sniping
Francis Pegahmagabow, a Canadian sniper with 378 confirmed kills, the highest in World War I
Simo Häyhä, a Finnish sniper who, using a standard iron-sighted bolt-action rifle, recorded the highest number of confirmed kills in any major war (505 or 542)
 Ivan Sidorenko, was among the top Soviet snipers in World War 2, with over 500 confirmed kills.
 Vasily Zaytsev, a Soviet sniper who amassed 225 kills during the Battle of Stalingrad
 Lyudmila Pavlichenko, a Soviet sniper during World War II, credited with 309 kills, and regarded as the most successful female sniper in history
 Adelbert Waldron, a US sniper who has the highest number of confirmed kills for US snipers during the Vietnam War (109)
 Chris Kyle, a US Navy SEAL sniper credited with the highest number of kills (160 officially confirmed) for an American sniper.

References

Bibliography

 

 

 

 

 

 
 
 

Sniper warfare
Sniper kills